Qilian County is a county of Qinghai Province, China. The Haibei Qilian Airport is located in the county.

Climate

Geographical 

Qilian County covers an area of 15,700 square kilometers, accounting for 2.05% of the total area of Qinghai Province. Qilian County borders Menyuan Hui Autonomous County to the east, Gungca County and Haiyan County to the south, and Tianjun County to the southwest. To the north and northwest, it borders Jiuquan City and Sunan Yugu Autonomous County and Minle County in Gansu Province.

Qilian County contains a total of seven townships, which are Babao, Zhamashen, Yeniugou, Kekeli, Mole, Duolong, Ebao, and Aru. As well as a ranch in Haibei Prefecture Toller Ranch. The town of Babao is the economic and political center of Qilian County.

Qilian County is named after its location in the Qilian Mountains，"Qilian" means "heavenly mountain" in Xiongnu language, and in ancient times it was the place where the Qiang people gathered.

Qilian County is in the middle part of the Qilian Mountains, the average altitude of 3169m, 4000m altitude above the alpine zone of snow all year round.The elevation of the county town is 2787m.

The average year-round temperature in the county is 1 degree Celsius, the climate type is highland climate, and the annual precipitation is about 270～600.The climate is typical of a Alpine climate. Due to its geographical location, Qilian County is subject to humid air currents from the southeast monsoon in the summer and high pressure from Mongolia and dry and cold air currents from Siberia in the winter, resulting in large temperature differences and low temperatures.

The total number of rivers in the county is 247, the main rivers are Mole River, Black River, Babao River and Tuole River, with an annual runoff of 2.322 billion cubic meters

History 
The history of human activity in the Qilian area can be traced back to the Han Dynasty, more than 2,000 years ago. The Qilian County area was inhabited by the Qiang people in ancient times, and was adjacent to the Yuezhi people during the Xia, Shang, and Zhou dynasties, as well as during the Qin dynasty (circa 2200 B.C.-206 A.D.).

In the sixth year of the Han Dynasty (201 AD), the Yuezhi was attacked and invaded by the Xiongnu kings and some of them moved to the Qilian Mountains. names in history are "Lesser Yuezhi“

In the year 121, Huo Qubing went and led his warriors to capture the Qilian Mountains, and the power of the Xiongnu and Yuezhi was greatly reduced in the Qilian Mountains, from then on the Yuezhi in the Qilian Mountains and the Huangshui valley were subservient to the Han.Since then, Han Chinese have also settled in this area.

During the Eastern Han Dynasty, the lesser Yuezhi, who lived in the present-day Nongniugoudi area of Qilian County, were influenced to evolve into the "Lushui Hu", and later, due to the influence of Han culture, they gradually integrated into the Han clan during the Northern Wei Dynasty.

On October 1, 1949, the People's Republic of China was founded and the Chinese People's Liberation Army was stationed in the "Babao" area. Qilian was liberated and on September 13, 1951, the Qinghai Provincial People's Government changed Qilian County into a city under provincial jurisdiction. In 1952, the Qilian Autonomous Region People's Government was established and in 1980, Qilian County was restored to the People's Government and placed under the jurisdiction of Haibei Tibetan Autonomous Prefecture until today.

Animal 
There are more than 20 species of wild animals found in Qilian County, and according to statistics, there are about 20,000 of them, mainly classified as rare and protected animals, ornamental animals, meat animals, and fur animals, and wild animals are mainly found in Yeniugou, Kokoli yoroulongwa, jiadao, etc.

Qilian Deer Farm 
Qilian Deer Farm is the largest semi-wild deer breeding base in Asia，Qilian Deer Farm covers an area of about 60,000 acres, with an average altitude of 3,500 meters, Qilian Deer Farm is located in the Oil Gourd Wildlife Nature Reserve, 40 kilometers from Qilian County, a local tourist attraction, established in 1958, at the beginning of the establishment, the deer farm only local Cervus elaphus and white-lipped deer, in 1964 the introduction of the Cervus nippon.

Natural resources 
There are 41 kinds of mineral resources in Qilian County, among which the main minerals are coal, asbestos, alluvial gold, etc.

There are 369 species of plants in Qilian County, including those with medicinal value, such as Saussurea involucrata, cordyceps, rhubarb, bupleurum, astragalus,

Population 

Qilian County has a total population of 43,700 people, Qilian County is inhabited by ethnic minorities, with about 15 ethnic groups living here, mainly Tibetan, Hui, Han, Monguor, Gaoshan people, Zhuang and Korean.The main religions spread in Qilian area are Tibetan Buddhism and Islam, Tibetans are mainly concentrated in arou, ebao, yeniugou, kekeli, Mongolians mainly live in mole and duolong, Hui are concentrated in Babaoxiang and the county.

See also
 List of administrative divisions of Qinghai

Sources
1:Qilian Xian zhi = Annals of Qi Lian country. Qilian xian zhi bian zuan wei yuan hui, 祁连县志编纂委员会.  Lanzhou: Gansu ren min chu ban she. 1993. .

2:Li, Jingzhong; Liu, Yongmei; Mo, Chonghui; Wang, Lei; Pang, Guowei; Cao, Mingming (2016-02-16). "IKONOS Image-Based Extraction of the Distribution Area of Stellera chamaejasme L. in Qilian County of Qinghai Province, China". Remote Sensing. 8 (2): 148. . .

3:刘, 宗广; 戴, 国华; 陈, 立同; 冯, 晓娟; 朱, 珊珊; 贺, 金生 (2016-06-01). "青藏高原高寒草地土壤中脂肪酸的分布特征". SCIENTIA SINICA Terrae. 46 (6): 756–767. . .

4：Li, Leilei (2019). "The Community Characteristics and Monthly Variation Patterns of Butterfly Species in Qilian County, Qinghai Province, China". Journal of Ecology and Rural Environment. .

5：天境祁连- 祁连具导游词 (in Chinese). Zhong Guo wen lian chu ban she. 2007. .

7：Suonanduojie; 索南多杰 (2007). Li shi de hen ji : Qilian Xian di ming wen hua shi yi (Di 1 ban ed.). Beijing. . .

8：YANG, Cheng-De; CHEN, Xiu-Rong; LONG, Rui-Jun; Xue, Li; ZHANG, Zhen-Fen (2009-12-25). "Distribution characteristics of soil carbon during forage greening in different alpine grasslands of Eastern Qilian Mountains". Chinese Journal of Eco-Agriculture. 17 (6): 1111–1116. . .

9:Li, Shuo; Zhe, hao Jiang; gang Zhang, De; nan Nie, Zhong; gang Chen, Jian; zhen Hu, Xin; Chen, Lu; ru Yuan, Zi; Ren, Ling (2016-08-20). "Distribution characteristics of soil organic carbon in northern slope of alpine meadow steppe in Qilian mountains in Qilian County, Qinghai Province". Pratacultural Science. .

10:Zhao, yuanshun (2018-02-05). "祁连县生态文化旅游的发展" The development of ecological and cultural tourism in Qilian County. QUN WEN TIAN DI.

References

External links
 
 

County-level divisions of Qinghai
Haibei Tibetan Autonomous Prefecture